Elections to Magherafelt District Council were held on 17 May 1989, on the same day as the other Northern Irish local government elections. The election used three district electoral areas to elect a total of 15 councillors.

Election results

Note: "Votes" are the first preference votes.

Districts summary

|- class="unsortable" align="centre"
!rowspan=2 align="left"|Ward
! % 
!Cllrs
! % 
!Cllrs
! %
!Cllrs
! %
!Cllrs
! % 
!Cllrs
!rowspan=2|TotalCllrs
|- class="unsortable" align="center"
!colspan=2 bgcolor="" | SDLP
!colspan=2 bgcolor="" | UUP
!colspan=2 bgcolor="" | DUP
!colspan=2 bgcolor="" | Sinn Féin
!colspan=2 bgcolor="white"| Others
|-
|align="left"|Magherafelt Town
|27.4
|1
|18.5
|1
|bgcolor="#D46A4C"|36.7
|bgcolor="#D46A4C"|2
|15.9
|1
|1.5
|0
|5
|-
|align="left"|Moyola
|21.3
|1
|bgcolor="40BFF5"|29.5
|bgcolor="40BFF5"|2
|21.5
|1
|24.2
|1
|3.5
|0
|5
|-
|align="left"|Sperrin
|bgcolor="#99FF66"|31.2
|bgcolor="#99FF66"|2
|14.4
|1
|10.8
|0
|26.6
|1
|17.0
|1
|5
|- class="unsortable" class="sortbottom" style="background:#C9C9C9"
|align="left"| Total
|26.7
|4
|20.7
|4
|23.4
|3
|22.1
|3
|7.1
|1
|15
|-
|}

District results

Magherafelt Town

1985: 2 x DUP, 1 x SDLP, 1 x UUP, 1 x Sinn Féin
1989: 2 x DUP, 1 x SDLP, 1 x UUP, 1 x Sinn Féin
1985-1989 Change: No change

Moyola

1985: 2 x DUP, 1 x Sinn Féin, 1 x UUP, 1 x SDLP
1989: 2 x UUP, 1 x Sinn Féin, 1 x DUP, 1 x SDLP
1985-1989 Change: UUP gain from DUP

Sperrin

1985: 2 x SDLP, 2 x Sinn Féin, 1 x UUP
1989: 2 x SDLP, 1 x Sinn Féin, 1 x UUP, 1 x Independent Nationalist
1985-1989 Change: SDLP gain from Sinn Féin, Independent Nationalist leaves SDLP

References

Magherafelt District Council elections
Magherafelt